Longitarsus ferrugineus is a species of black coloured beetle in the subfamily Galerucinae that can be found in Austria, Belarus, Benelux, Croatia, Czech Republic, Great Britain, Germany, Italy (including the island of Sardinia), Latvia, Lithuania, Slovakia, Slovenia, Spain, Switzerland, and in Northern Europe (except for Finland, Norway, Portugal, and Russia).

References

F
Beetles described in 1860
Beetles of Europe